Common Programming Interface for Communications (CPI-C) is an application programming interface (API) developed by IBM in 1987 to provide a platform-independent communications interface for the IBM Systems Application Architecture-based network, and to standardise programming access to SNA LU 6.2.
CPI-C was part of IBM Systems Application Architecture (SAA), an attempt to standardise APIs across all IBM platforms.

It was adopted in 1992 by X/Open as an open systems standard, identified as standard C210, and documented in X/Open Developers Specification: CPI-C.

See also 
 IBM Advanced Program-to-Program Communication

References

External links
 Distributed Transaction Processing: The XCPI-C Specification Version 2
CPIC Reference Manual
 CPI-C for MVS
 Chapter 21. Using CPIC-C for Java, IBM SecureWay Communications Server
 Programming with the CPI-C API, John Lyons, 31 May 1997

IBM software
Systems Network Architecture
Network software